George Kipiani (born 12 August 1978) is a former Georgian professional football player and currently the coach of Georgia national under-19 football team.

External links
 
 haaretz.com

1978 births
Expatriate footballers in Greece
Expatriate footballers in Israel
Expatriate footballers in Latvia
FC Metalurgi Rustavi managers
Footballers from Georgia (country)
Georgia (country) international footballers
Expatriate footballers from Georgia (country)
Expatriate sportspeople from Georgia (country) in Latvia
Hapoel Be'er Sheva F.C. players
Hapoel Jerusalem F.C. players
Living people
Maccabi Kiryat Gat F.C. players
Panetolikos F.C. players
Skonto FC players
Israeli Premier League players
Liga Leumit players
Association football midfielders
FC Torpedo Moscow players
Football managers from Georgia (country)
Expatriate sportspeople from Georgia (country) in Russia
Expatriate sportspeople from Georgia (country) in Israel
Expatriate sportspeople from Georgia (country) in Greece
Footballers from Tbilisi
Erovnuli Liga players